William Cowan may refer to:

William Cowan (footballer) (1900–1979), English footballer
William Cowan (fur trader) (1818–1902), of the Hudson's Bay Company
William Cowan (politician) (1825–1899), reeve of North Gower Township, Ontario
William Henry Cowan (1862–1932), Scottish politician
W. Maxwell Cowan (William Maxwell Cowan, 1931–2002), South African neuroscientist
Mo Cowan (William Maurice Cowan, born 1969), U.S. Senator from Massachusetts 
William Cowan (engineer) (1823–1898)
Bill Cowan (born 1943), security expert
Bill Cowan (tennis) (born 1959), Canadian tennis player
Billy Cowan (born 1938), retired baseball player
Billy Cowan (footballer) (1896–?), Scottish footballer

See also
Cowan (surname)